Diamond is an unincorporated community in Plaquemines Parish, Louisiana, United States.

Notes

Unincorporated communities in Plaquemines Parish, Louisiana
Unincorporated communities in Louisiana